Microsoft Power Platform is a line of business intelligence, app development, and app connectivity software applications. Microsoft developed the Power Fx low-code programming language for expressing logic across the Power Platform. It also provides integrations with GitHub and Teams.

Products
The Power Platform family of products includes:
 Power BI, software for visualizing data with different kinds of charts. It competes with tools like Tableau.
 Power Apps, graphical software for writing low-code custom business applications. (Known as PowerApps until 2019).
 Power Automate, a toolkit similar to IFTTT and Zapier for implementing business workflow products. (Formerly Microsoft Flow).
 Power Automate Desktop (PAD), robotic process automation (RPA) software for automating graphical user interfaces (via the acquisition of Softomotive in May 2020). This product uses a Robin Script based language to achieve RPA.  
 Power Virtual Agents, software for writing chatbots
 Power Pages, graphical software for making low-code websites. Formerly part of Power Apps as "Power Apps Portals" until 2022

Microsoft Dataverse 

Microsoft Dataverse, formerly known as Microsoft Common Data Service until November 2020, is a relational database engine offered by Microsoft as a cloud based data management software as a service for storing business data. Is is mainly a database with associated functionalities, and separates itself from on-prem solutions like for example Microsoft Access in that a developer needs internet access to connect to Dataverse. It is mainly a tool for managing and storing data, and allows for creation and management of datasets through a single user interface.

MS Dataverse is marketed for use with other Microsoft products such as Power Apps and Microsoft Dynamics 365 applications, and has data connectors to other Microsoft products like Azure Event Hub, Azure Service Bus, Microsoft SQL and Azure Data Lake. One example of use could be to use Dataverse as a form of data lake together with Microsoft Power Apps. Dataverse is also available as a separate service for companies who want to develop their own solutions, and has integration capabilities to other systems through webhooks. Dataverse has APIs so that the data can be consumed by other services, like for example Power Platform services like Power BI or Power Apps, or by custom services designed in for example Visual Studio.

In addition to relational data, Dataverse also has support for file and blob storage, data lakes and semi-structured data. One example of use could be to use Dataverse as a form of data lake together with Microsoft Power Apps. Dataverse is based on Microsoft's Common Data Model as its common data model and is built on Microsoft Azure SQL where its physical data also is stored. In November 2020, Microsoft's Common Data Service was rebranded into Dataverse.

Dataverse has the possibility to apply business logic like duplicate detection, calculated fields, rollup fields and business rules. It can be used to discover, validate and report data, and has the possibility to use Microsoft's proprietary common data model. Access in MS Dataverse is handled with Azure Active Directory which has conditional access and multi-factor authentication (MFA), and offers individual column and row level security.

See also
Microsoft Azure
Microsoft Dynamics
Microsoft Office
List of Microsoft software

References

Power Automate

Further reading

External links
 
 Microsoft Power Platform documentation

Power Platform
Bundled products or services
Business software
Microsoft development tools
2018 software

Low Code Application Platform